The 2006 SEC men's basketball tournament took place from March 9–12, 2006 in Nashville, Tennessee at the Gaylord Entertainment Center. The SEC Championship Game was televised by CBS.

The top two teams in both the Eastern and Western Divisions received byes in the first round, which were Tennessee, Alabama, LSU, and Florida and played their second round games on March 10, 2006. The SEC Tournament winner (Florida) received the SEC's automatic bid to the NCAA Tournament en route to winning the 2006 NCAA National Championship.

Final SEC Regular Season Standings

Bracket

References

SEC men's basketball tournament
-
Basketball competitions in Nashville, Tennessee
2006 in sports in Tennessee
College sports tournaments in Tennessee